is a Japanese professional baseball player. An outfielder, he is currently with the Fukuoka SoftBank Hawks in Japan's Nippon Professional Baseball.

External links

1974 births
Living people
Baseball people from Kitakyushu
Japanese baseball players
Nippon Professional Baseball outfielders
Fukuoka Daiei Hawks players
Fukuoka SoftBank Hawks players